Bracketing is a photographic technique.

Bracketing may also refer to:
 Autobracketing, a camera feature for taking multiple shots with different settings
 Bracketing (linguistics), a term in morphological analysis
 Rebracketing, breaking a word into constituent parts inconsistent with its original etymology
 Bracketing (phenomenology), a method used by phenomenological sociologists
 Bracketing, a method for determining range by firing artillery shells both beyond and short of a target (the term "straddling" is also used instead)
 Inclusio, a literary device
 Bracketing, an economics term
 Bracketing in pharmaceutical validation is an approach in which the validation of extreme values of the tested samples is used to represent the validation of the whole gamut of values
Bracketing is the process of ordering multiple sizes of clothing online and then returning the ones that don't fit.